Wille-Werner Rydman (born 2 January 1986 in Helsinki) is a Finnish politician and a member of the Finnish Parliament, representing the Finns Party and formerly the National Coalition Party. Rydman was elected to the parliament in 2015, gaining 4,524 votes in the elections. He has also been a member of the City Council of Helsinki since 2012. He received a Masters of Social Sciences from the University of Helsinki in 2007, after which he worked as a parliamentary assistant.

Political Views
Helsingin Sanomat named Rydman as one of the most right-wing members of parliament elected in 2015. Rydman describes himself as a conservative.

References

1986 births
Living people
Politicians from Helsinki
National Coalition Party politicians
Finns Party politicians
Members of the Parliament of Finland (2015–19)
Members of the Parliament of Finland (2019–23)
University of Helsinki alumni